Ottaviano dei Conti di Segni (died January 29, 1234) was an Italian cardinal and cardinal-nephew of Pope Innocent III, his cousin who elevated him probably in May 1206. He was canon of the Vatican Basilica, Camerlengo of the Holy Roman Church (1200 until May 1206) and protodeacon of the Sacred College of Cardinals (from 1221).

References

Salvador Miranda, "Ottaviano dei Conti di Segni
Werner Maleczek, Papst und Kardinalskolleg von 1191 bis 1216, Wien 1984, p. 163

13th-century Italian cardinals
Cardinal-nephews
Cardinals created by Pope Innocent III
1234 deaths
Camerlengos of the Holy Roman Church
Year of birth unknown